John Charles Watt (6 July 1884 – 4 August 1961) was an Australian cricketer. He played one first-class match for Tasmania in 1904/05. His father, John Watt, also played first-class cricket for Tasmania.

See also
 List of Tasmanian representative cricketers

References

External links
 

1884 births
1961 deaths
Australian cricketers
Tasmania cricketers
Cricketers from Hobart